Amherst Regional Public Schools (sometimes referred to as the Union #26 and Amherst-Pelham Regional School Districts), is a group of school districts usually managed as a single entity, based in Amherst, Massachusetts which serves the Pioneer Valley of Western Massachusetts.

Governance
Three separate school committees are responsible for governance of the Amherst-Pelham school system.
 The Amherst School Committee is responsible for the four elementary schools in the town of Amherst.
 The Pelham School Committee is responsible for Pelham Elementary School.
 The Regional School Committee is responsible for Amherst Regional Middle School and Amherst Regional High School.

Superintendent
Mike Morris is the current Superintendent of schools.

The former superintendent, Alberto Rodriguez, left that position on March 8, 2010, after negative evaluations by senior managers and controversy about some changes he had proposed. Maria Geryk, Assistant Superintendent of Student Services, was appointed Interim Superintendent, and then confirmed as superintendent.

Schools
The district operates the following schools:
 Amherst Regional High School
 Amherst Regional Middle School
 Crocker Farm Elementary School
 Fort River Elementary School
 Pelham School (126 students, kindergarten through sixth grade)
 Wildwood Elementary School

 Formerly Operated
 Mark's Meadow Elementary School (closed in 2009/2010)

References

External links
 Official site

School districts in Massachusetts
Education in Hampshire County, Massachusetts